William George Thordsen (April 2, 1879 – May 8, 1932) was a sailor in the United States Navy and a Medal of Honor recipient for his actions in the Philippine Insurrection, or the Philippine-American War (1899-1902).

Thordsen joined the Navy from New York in 1898, and retired in 1910 at the rank of Chief Gunner's Mate (CGM).  He died May 8, 1932, and was buried at Arlington National Cemetery, Section 1, Grave 69-W.

Medal of Honor citation
Rank and organization: Coxswain, U.S. Navy. Born: April 2, 1879, Friedrichstadt, Germany. Accredited to: New York. Date of Issue: August 15, 1900.

Citation:

For heroism and gallantry under fire of the enemy at Hilongos, Philippine Islands, 6 May 1900.

See also

 List of Medal of Honor recipients
 List of Philippine–American War Medal of Honor recipients

References

1879 births
1932 deaths
United States Navy Medal of Honor recipients
United States Navy sailors
American military personnel of the Philippine–American War
Burials at Arlington National Cemetery
German-born Medal of Honor recipients
German emigrants to the United States
Philippine–American War recipients of the Medal of Honor
People from Friedrichstadt